This is a list of all seasons played by Dagenham & Redbridge F.C. in English football, from their inaugural season in 1992–93.

Seasons

Key

Division shown in bold when it changes due to promotion, relegation or league reorganisation.
League record shown in italics when season was abandoned.

Key to league record:
P = Played
W = Games won
D = Games drawn
L = Games lost
F = Goals for
A = Goals against
Pts = Points
Pos = Final position
 = Promoted
 = Relegated
* = Dagenham & Redbridge had points deducted
† = Season abandoned, final table decided by points-per-game

Key to divisions:
League 1 = Football League One
League 2 = Football League Two
Conference = Conference National
Isthmian Premier = Isthmian League Premier Division

Key to cup rounds:
— = Dagenham & Redbridge did not enter the competition
QR2 = Second Qualifying Round
QR3 = Third Qualifying Round
QR4 = Fourth Qualifying Round
R1 = First Round
R2 = Second Round
R3 = Third Round
R4 = Fourth Round
R5 = Fifth Round
QF = Quarter Final
SF = Semi Final
F = Final
QF(S) = Quarter Final Southern Section

Notes

Footnotes

A. : Dagenham & Redbridge lost 1–0 in the FA Trophy final to Woking at Wembley Stadium.
B. : Dagenham & Redbridge missed out on the Conference National title to Boston United on goal difference.
C. : Dagenham & Redbridge lost 3–2 (after extra time) in the 2003 Football Conference play-off Final to Doncaster Rovers at Britannia Stadium.
D. : Dagenham & Redbridge won 3–2 in the 2010 Football League Two play-off Final against Rotherham United at Wembley Stadium.
E. : Dagenham & Redbridge lost 3–1 on aggregate in the 2016–17 National League play-off semi-final to Forest Green Rovers.

References
General
 

Seasons
 
Dagenham and Redbridge